Piazzale Michelangelo (Michelangelo Square) is a square with a panoramic view of Florence, Italy, located in the Oltrarno district of the city.

History
This Florentine piazza was designed by architect Giuseppe Poggi and built in 1869 on a hill just south of the historic center, during the redevelopment of Oltrarno, the left (South) bank of the Arno river. In 1869, Florence was the capital of Italy and the whole city was involved in an urban renewal, the so-called "Risanamento" or the "Renovation" of the city's neighborhoods. Lungarni (riverside walkways; "lungarno", singular) were built on the riversides. On the right bank, the fourteenth-century city walls were removed and turned into the Viali di Circonvallazione, mimicking the French "boulevard" design, six lanes wide and lined with trees. On the left bank winding up the hill of San Miniato the Viale dei Colli was built, a tree-lined street over 8 kilometers long ending at the Piazzale Michelangelo which was built as a terrace with a panoramic view of the city. 

The square, dedicated to the Renaissance sculptor Michelangelo, has bronze copies of some of his marble works found elsewhere in Florence: the David and the four allegories of the Medici Chapel of San Lorenzo. The monument was brought up by nine pairs of oxen on 25 June 1873.

Poggi designed the loggia in the neoclassical-style that dominates the whole terrace, which today houses a restaurant. Originally it was intended to house a museum of works by Michelangelo, never realized. In the wall of the balcony, under the loggia, there is an epigraph in capital letters referring to his work: Poggi turned this into his monument in 1911.

The view captures the heart of Florence from Forte Belvedere to Santa Croce, across the lungarni and the bridges crossing the Arno, including the Ponte Vecchio, the Duomo, Palazzo Vecchio, the Bargello and the octagonal bell tower of the Badia Fiorentina. Beyond the city are the hills of Settignano and Fiesole.

The Piazzale Michelangelo can be accessed by car along the tree-lined Viale Michelangelo, constructed at the same time, or by walking the stairs or going up the ramps from the Piazza Giuseppe Poggi, also known as the "Poggi Ramps" in the district of San Niccolò.

The Piazzale Michelangelo was due to hold a Red Bull Soapbox Race in 2020 but this was cancelled due to restrictions imposed as a result of the coronavirus.

References

Michelangelo
1869 establishments in Italy
Neoclassical architecture in Florence